Matapa is a typical Mozambican dish, prepared with young cassava leaves, which are usually ground in a large wooden mortar and pestle before cooked with garlic, onion and coconut milk. Many "Matapa" dishes add cashew nuts, crab or shrimp and can be eaten with bread, rice, xima or alone.

See also 

Vatapá

African cuisine